Belgium was represented by Linda Lepomme, with the song "Laat me nu gaan", at the 1985 Eurovision Song Contest, which took place in Gothenburg, Sweden on 4 May. Flemish broadcaster BRT was responsible for selection of the 1985 Belgian entrant and, unusually for BRT at the time, opted for internal selection rather than a public final. The selection process was fraught with problems before the last-minute announcement of singer and song was made.

Before Eurovision

Internal selection 
BRT selected singer Mireille Capelle as their entrant, to perform a tango-flavoured song with music by Frédéric Devreese. The song was chosen in an unfinished state, without lyrics. Capelle and Devreese subsequently submitted a set of lyrics by one of Flanders' best-known and respected authors Hugo Claus. BRT were not impressed however, and proposed a different set of lyrics by Bert Vivier. Capelle and Devreese refused to have anything to do with the Vivier lyrics, and gave BRT an ultimatum that they would disassociate themselves from the selection unless their lyrics of choice were approved. When BRT refused to back down, Capelle and Devreese were as good as their word and withdrew their participation.

This left BRT facing a race against time to find an alternative song and performer: several singers and songs were put forward and found unsuitable before BRT finally settled on singer/actress Linda Lepomme with the song "Laat me nu gaan". The song was presented publicly at the last minute, on 1 April 1985.

At Eurovision 
On the night of the final Lepomme performed 8th in the running order, following Turkey and preceding Portugal. At the close of the voting "Laat me nu gaan" had received only 7 points, placing Belgium last of the 19 entries, the sixth time the country had finished the evening at the bottom of the scoreboard. The Belgian jury awarded its 12 points to contest winners Norway.

Voting

See also
Belgium in the Eurovision Song Contest
Eurovision Song Contest 1985

References 

1985
Countries in the Eurovision Song Contest 1985